The 2012 Honolulu mayoral election was held on Tuesday, November 6, 2012, to elect the Mayor of the City and County of Honolulu. Kirk Caldwell was elected mayor, beating opponent and former Hawaii governor Ben Cayetano.

The position of Mayor of Honolulu is non-partisan. A non-partisan blanket primary was held on 11 August 2012. Because no candidate received an outright majority of the vote in the primary, the top two finishers, Ben Cayetano and Kirk Caldwell, advanced to the November general election runoff. Incumbent Independent mayor Peter Carlisle was seeking a first full term in office but finished third in the primary and did not proceed to the runoff election.

Candidates
 Kirk Caldwell, former Acting Mayor of Honolulu and Managing Director of Honolulu (voter registration: Democratic)
 Ben Cayetano, former Governor of Hawaii (voter registration: Democratic)

Eliminated
 Peter Carlisle, incumbent Mayor (voter registration: Independent); third in primary election and was eliminated
 Khistina Caldwell Dejean, unsuccessful candidate for mayor in 2010; fourth in primary election and was eliminated

Primary

Polling

Results

General election

Polling

Results

By district

References

External links
 Kirk Caldwell for Mayor
 Peter Carlisle for Mayor
 Ben Cayetano for Mayor

2012 Hawaii elections
Mayoral elections in Honolulu
2012 United States mayoral elections